Cheiloclinium is a genus of flowering plants belonging to the family Celastraceae.

Its native range is Tropical America.

Species:

Cheiloclinium anomalum 
Cheiloclinium articulatum 
Cheiloclinium belizense 
Cheiloclinium cognatum 
Cheiloclinium diffusiflorum 
Cheiloclinium habropodum 
Cheiloclinium hippocrateoides 
Cheiloclinium klugii 
Cheiloclinium neglectum 
Cheiloclinium obtusum 
Cheiloclinium pedunculatum 
Cheiloclinium puberulum 
Cheiloclinium schwackeanum 
Cheiloclinium serratum

References

Celastraceae
Celastrales genera